Clearing the Trail is a lost 1928 American silent Western film directed by B. Reeves Eason and starring Hoot Gibson. It was produced and released through Universal Pictures.

Cast
 Hoot Gibson - Pete Watson
 Dorothy Gulliver - Ellen
 Fred Gilman - Steve Watson
 C. E. Anderson - Don Talbot
 Philo McCullough - Silk Cardross
 Andrew Waldron - Judge Price (* as Andy Waldron)
 Duke R. Lee - Cook (* as Duke Lee)
 Monte Montague - Tramp
 The Universal Ranche Riders - Ranch Hands

References

External links
 
 

1928 films
Lost American films
Universal Pictures films
Films directed by B. Reeves Eason
1928 Western (genre) films
Lost Western (genre) films
American black-and-white films
1928 lost films
Silent American Western (genre) films
1920s American films